The Komala Party of Iranian Kurdistan – Reunification Faction simply known as the Komala – Reunification Faction, was an armed communist and separatist ethnic party of Kurds in Iran, currently exiled in northern Iraq.

It split from the Komala Party of Iranian Kurdistan on 29 April 2008 over internal disagreements and is led by Abdulla Konaposhi.

History

See also

References

2008 establishments in Iraq
Banned communist parties
Banned Kurdish parties
Banned political parties in Iran
Communism in Kurdistan
Communist militant groups
Communist parties in Iran
Communist parties in Iraq
Marxist parties in Iran
Marxist parties in Iraq
Kurdish political parties in Iran
Kurdish political parties in Iraq
Left-wing militant groups in Iran
Militant opposition to the Islamic Republic of Iran
Organisations designated as terrorist by Iran
Political parties in Kurdistan Region